Biharipur  is a village in Kapurthala district of Punjab State, India. The village is administrated by a Sarpanch, who is an elected representative.

Demography 
According to the report published by Census India in 2011, Biharipur has a total number of 208 houses and population of 954 of which include 486 males and 468 females. Literacy rate of Biharipur is  79.96%, higher than state average of 75.84%.  The population of children under the age of 6 years is 61 which is 6.39% of total population of Biharipur, and child sex ratio is approximately  694, lower than state average of 846.

Population data

Air travel connectivity 
The closest airport to the village is Sri Guru Ram Dass Jee International Airport.

Villages in Kapurthala

External links
  Villages in Kapurthala
 Kapurthala Villages List

References

Villages in Kapurthala district